Suite bergamasque (L. 75) is a piano suite by Claude Debussy. He began composing it around 1890, at the age of 28, but significantly revised it just before its 1905 publication. The popularity of the 3rd movement, "Clair de lune", has made it one of the composer's most famous works for piano, as well as one of the most famous musical pieces of all-time.

Background
The composer was initially unwilling to use these relatively early piano compositions because they were not in his mature style, but in 1905 he accepted the offer of a publisher who thought they would be successful, given the fame Debussy had gained in the intervening fifteen years. While it is not known how much of the Suite was written in 1890 and how much was written in 1905, it is clear that Debussy changed the names of at least two of the pieces. "Passepied" had first been composed under the title "Pavane", while "Clair de lune" was originally entitled "Promenade sentimentale". These names come from poems by Paul Verlaine. The title of the third movement of Suite bergamasque is taken from Verlaine's poem "Clair de lune", which refers to bergamasks in the opening stanza:

Structure

Suite bergamasque consists of four movements:

 Prélude (Moderato tempo rubato, F major)
 Menuet (Andante, A minor)
 Clair de lune (Andante très expressif, D major)
 Passepied (Allegretto ma non troppo, F minor)

Movements

1. Prélude
The first piece in the suite, entitled "Prélude", is in the key of F major and marked moderato tempo rubato. Its legato phrases give it a smooth, flowing feel.

2. Menuet
The second movement of Suite bergamasque is the "Menuet", in A minor. Rather than mimicking the articulations of a baroque minuet from the start, Debussy eschews the accent on the downbeat of the first measures. The light, fluttery embellishments Debussy writes throughout the movement give it the character of an arabesque.

3. Clair de lune

The third movement of Suite bergamasque is "Clair de lune", in D major. It is written in  meter and marked andante très expressif. Its title, which means "moonlight" in French, is taken from Verlaine's poem "Clair de lune". It is not to be confused with the two settings of the poem composed by Debussy for voice and piano accompaniment.

4. Passepied
The final movement, entitled "Passepied", is in F minor, marked allegretto ma non troppo. A passepied is a type of dance that originated in Brittany. This movement is fast and light, with the left hand playing an almost continuous quaver accompaniment.  The movement includes the use of 3 against 4 polyrhythm.

Arrangements
Suite bergamasque has been orchestrated and arranged by many people, both for concert performance and for use in other media.

In particular, "Clair de lune" has been arranged for a wide variety of instrumental combinations, including notable orchestrations by André Caplet, Leopold Stokowski, and Lucien Cailliet.

"Clair de lune" was originally intended to be included as a fully orchestrated piece in the 1940 Walt Disney animated film Fantasia. However, due to runtime issues, it was eventually not included in the final cut of the film. Instead, the footage for its intended segment (featuring herons in the Florida Everglades at night) was recycled for the "Blue Bayou" segment of the subsequent film Make Mine Music. However, the "Clair de lune" segment was later restored after a workprint of it was rediscovered in 1992, complete with an original score by Stokowski and the Philadelphia Orchestra. It is included as a bonus feature in some later releases of Fantasia.

"Passepied" was arranged by the Punch Brothers for bluegrass instrumentation for their album The Phosphorescent Blues.

A synthesizer arrangement of "Clair de lune" was used at the Closing Ceremony at the 2020 Summer Olympics on August 8, 2021, as children prayed for peace and as the Olympic Flame was put off. This was the version produced by the Japanese electronic music pioneer Isao Tomita for his 1974 album Snowflakes Are Dancing, consisting of arrangements and renditions of compositions by Debussy, including Passepied.

In the video game Sayonara Wild Hearts by Annapurna Interactive, the first level is titled "Clair De Lune", and the level's music uses samples from the respective movement.

Notes

External links

Suite bergamasque: "Clair de Lune" at www.wikisource.org
Suite bergamasque at Cantorion.org

Suites by Claude Debussy
Compositions for solo piano
1905 compositions
Orchestral suites
Piano